Nathan Michael Hall (born April 6, 1996) is an American football linebacker for the Memphis Showboats of the United States Football League (USFL). He played football at Northwestern University.

Early years
Hall attended Southview High School, where he practiced football, basketball and track. In football, he was a two-way player at tight end and defensive back. As a senior, he received All-Ohio, All-Blade and All-Conference honors.

He finished his high school career with 111 tackles, three interceptions, and 16 receptions for 408 yards.

College career
Hall accepted a football scholarship from Northwestern University. As a redshirt freshman, he replaced an injured Jaylen Prater and started the last 4 games at outside linebacker. He tallied 56 tackles (fifth on the team). He had 10 tackles against Penn State University.

As a sophomore, he appeared in 13 games with 8 starts at middle linebacker. He collected 73 tackles (third on the team) and 6 tackles for loss.

As a junior, he was named a full-time starter at middle linebacker, registering 79 tackles (second on the team), 16.5 tackles for loss (sixth in school history), 5 sacks, 2 interceptions and 6 pass breakups. He had 11 tackles (8 solo) and 3.5 tackles for loss against the University of Maryland. He made an interception in the Wildcats endzone to seal a 39–31 triple-overtime win against 16th-ranked Michigan State University. He tore his right ACL while practicing for the 2017 Music City Bowl.

As a senior, he started 9 games and missed 5 contests (including the 2018 Holiday Bowl) with a shoulder injury. He posted 51 tackles (5.5 for loss), 3 interceptions (tied for the team lead) and 2 pass breakups. He had 10 tackles against Purdue University.

Professional career

Dallas Cowboys
Hall was signed by the Dallas Cowboys as an undrafted free agent after the 2019 NFL Draft on April 30. He was waived on August 31.

Buffalo Bills
On September 1, 2019, Hall was signed to the Buffalo Bills' practice squad. He was released on September 12, but re-signed back to practice squad on September 24. He was released on October 29.

Houston Texans
On December 3, 2019, Hall was signed to the Houston Texans practice squad. He signed a reserve/future contract with the Texans on January 13, 2020.

On September 5, 2020, Hall was waived by the Texans and signed to the practice squad the next day. He was elevated to the active roster on October 10, November 7, and November 14 for the team's weeks 5, 9, and 10 games, two against the Jacksonville Jaguars, and one against the Cleveland Browns, and reverted to the practice squad after each game. He was promoted to the active roster on November 21, 2020. In Week 12 against the Detroit Lions, Hall recorded his first two career sacks on Matthew Stafford during the 41–25 win.

On August 2, 2021, Hall was waived by the Texans.

Carolina Panthers
On August 3, 2021, Hall was claimed off waivers by the Carolina Panthers. He was waived/injured on August 17 and placed on injured reserve. He was released on August 23.

Los Angeles Chargers
On October 13, 2021, Hall was signed to the Los Angeles Chargers practice squad, but was released the next day.

Arizona Cardinals
On December 7, 2021, Hall was signed to the Arizona Cardinals practice squad. He was released on January 10, 2022.

Tennessee Titans
On January 24, 2022, Hall signed a reserve/future contract with the Tennessee Titans. He was waived on May 2, 2022.

Memphis Showboats
Hall signed with the Memphis Showboats of the USFL on December 13, 2022.

References

External links
Northwestern bio

1996 births
Living people
Sportspeople from Toledo, Ohio
Players of American football from Ohio
American football linebackers
Northwestern Wildcats football players
Dallas Cowboys players
Buffalo Bills players
Houston Texans players
Carolina Panthers players
Los Angeles Chargers players
Arizona Cardinals players
Tennessee Titans players